The Slocan River is a  long tributary of the Kootenay River in the Canadian province of British Columbia. It is part of the Columbia River basin, as the Kootenay River is a tributary of the Columbia River.

Course
The Slocan River originates at the south end of Slocan Lake and flows south past Slocan and Winlaw to join the Kootenay River near Shoreacres, about halfway between Castlegar and Nelson. The route includes a mixture of broad flatwater, lazy meanders, gentle flows and, on the lowest section, a few rapids.

See also
List of British Columbia rivers
Tributaries of the Columbia River

References

Rivers of British Columbia
Tributaries of the Kootenay River
Kootenay Land District